Efmoroctocog alfa, sold under the brand name Elocta among others, is a medication for the treatment and prophylaxis of bleeding in people with hemophilia A. Efmoroctocog alfa is a recombinant human coagulation factor VIII, Fc fusion protein (rFVIIIFc). It is produced by recombinant DNA technology in a human embryonic kidney (HEK) cell line. 

It was approved for medical use in the United States in June 2014, and for use in the European Union in November 2015.

Medical uses 
In the United States, efmoroctocog alfa (Eloctate) is indicated for adults and children with Hemophilia A for (1) on-demand treatment and control of bleeding episodes, (2) perioperative management, and (3) routine prophylaxis to prevent or reduce the frequency of bleeding episodes.

In the European Union, efmoroctocog alfa (Elocta) is indicated for treatment and prophylaxis of bleeding in people with haemophilia A.

References

External links 
 

Recombinant proteins